Gastropexy is a surgical operation in which the stomach is sutured to the abdominal wall or the diaphragm. Gastropexys in which the stomach is sutured to the diaphragm are sometimes performed as a treatment of GERD to prevent the stomach from moving up into the chest.

See also 
 Laparoscopic surgery

References 

Digestive system surgery